Jai Parkash (born 2 December 1954) is an Indian politician. He represented the Hissar constituency of Haryana and is a member of the Indian National Congress (INC) political party. He served as Deputy Minister in Ministry of Petroleum and Chemicals in Chandra Shekhar cabinet. He was member of 9th, 11th, 14th Lok Sabha.

References

External links
 Official biographical sketch in Parliament of India website

Also minister of petroleum in Chandrashekhar government

1954 births
Living people
Indian National Congress politicians
India MPs 1989–1991
India MPs 1996–1997
India MPs 2004–2009
People from Hisar district
People from Kaithal
Lok Sabha members from Haryana
Janata Dal politicians
Haryana Vikas Party politicians